Okumuki is the debut album by Italian singer L'Aura, issued in 2005. The album was Produced, Arranged, Engineered and Mixed by Enrique Gonzalez Müller.

Track listing 
 Demons (In your dreams) (Laura Abela/Dan Fries)
 Una favola (Laura Abela)
 Radio star (Laura Abela/Dan Fries)
 Piove (Laura Abela)
 Breathing (Laura Abela)
 Domani (Laura Abela)
 Lettere d'amore (Laura Abela/Dan Fries)
 Alice (Laura Abela)
 Mr. Oh! (Laura Abela)
 Today (Laura Abela)
 If everybody had a gun (Laura Abela)

Okumuki (re-release) (2006) 
After the participation at the Sanremo Music Festival, L'Aura re-released Okumuki with three new songs, Irraggiungibile, sung at Sanremo, Dar Lin, Degli Alberi and a cover of Life On Mars by David Bowie.
The re-release has been very successful and was certified Gold in Italy.

 Irraggiungibile
 Today
 Radio star
 Una favola
 Demons (In your dreams)
 Piove
 Dar Lin
 Breathing
 Degli alberi
 If everybody had a gun
 Alice
 Domani
 Lettere d'amore
 Mr. Oh!
 Life on Mars

Chart

References

2005 debut albums
L'Aura albums